Standalone or Stand-alone may refer to:

Stand-alone DSL, a digital subscriber line without analog telephone service; also known as naked DSL
Stand-alone expansion pack, an expansion pack which does not require the original game in order to use the new content
Stand-alone inverter, a power inverter that converts direct current into alternating current independent of a utility grid
Standalone network or Intranet, a computer network that uses Internet protocol technology within an organization
Stand-alone shell, a Unix shell designed for recovering from system failures
Stand-alone power system, an off-the-grid electricity system
Stand-alone store, a store not directly connected with a shopping mall
Standalone film, a film that does not have any relation to other films
Stand-alone sequel, a sequel set in the same fictional universe but having little or no reference to predecessors
Standalone software (disambiguation)

See also
Stand Alone, a 1985 action film
One shot (disambiguation)
One-off (disambiguation)